On July 4, 1985, the New York Mets beat the Atlanta Braves 16–13 in a 19-inning Major League Baseball contest that featured Keith Hernandez hitting for the cycle, Mets manager Davey Johnson being ejected, and the Braves coming back to tie the game twice in extra innings, most notably in the bottom of the 18th. 

The game was especially highlighted by relief pitcher Rick Camp, a career .060 hitter at the time with no home runs batting only because the Braves had no position players left, shockingly hitting a solo home run on a 0–2 pitch in the 18th off of Tom Gorman to re-tie the game at 11–11. As a result, it has become known simply as the Rick Camp game.

Game
Following a 90 minute rain delay, the game was finally set to begin around 9:00 p.m. EST. Both teams scored a run in the first. In the top of the first, Gary Carter drove in Keith Hernandez with a single. The Braves countered, with Claudell Washington leading the frame off with a triple, then scoring on a Rafael Ramírez groundout.

Mets starter Dwight Gooden continued to struggle by walking three of the next four batters to load the bases with two outs. He ultimately however, managed to escape the jam by forcing a Rick Cerone groundout to end the Atlanta threat.

After 2 1/3 innings, the rain came down again for another 41 minutes, consequently bouncing Gooden from the game. Mets manager Davey Johnson, proceeded to play the game under protest after he wasn't allowed to make a double-switch when Gooden left the game. Crew chief Terry Tata ruled that Mets reliever Roger McDowell had officially entered the game when he came onto the field to inspect the mound after the delay. The Braves then took a 3–1 lead in the third after the rain delay.

Braves manager Eddie Haas on the other hand, stuck with his starter, Rick Mahler following the second delay. In the top of the fourth, Mets rallied for four runs to take a 5–3 lead, thanks in part to a Wally Backman RBI single into center field off of Braves reliever Jeff Dedmon. In the bottom of the fourth, Terry Leach came in to relieve Roger McDowell, who had been pinch-hit for by Clint Hurdle in the top of the frame, and only allowed one run on four hits over the next four innings.

In the top of the sixth, Keith Hernandez singled, one of the two hits he needed to complete the cycle, but umpire Terry Tata incorrectly ruled that his line drive to center had been caught by Dale Murphy. Eventually though, Hernandez would homer in the eighth and single in the 12th to complete the cycle.

In the bottom of the eighth with the Mets leading 7–4, Dale Murphy hit a bases-clearing double off of Jesse Orosco to give the Braves the 8–7 lead. The Mets answered with a run in the ninth with consecutive singles from Howard Johnson, Danny Heep, and Lenny Dykstra against Bruce Sutter.

The score would remain tied until the 13th, when Howard Johnson hit a two-run homer off of Terry Forster to put the Mets ahead 10–8. The Braves' Terry Harper tied it again with a home run in the bottom of the frame. In the top of 17th with the score was tied at 10, both Davey Johnson and Darryl Strawberry got ejected for arguing balls and strikes.

The Mets however grabbed an 11–10 lead in the 18th on a Lenny Dykstra sacrifice fly. In the bottom of the 18th, Braves pitcher Rick Camp was batting against Tom Gorman and proceeded to hit the 0-and-2 pitch for a home run over the left field wall.

Gary Carter led off the 19th with a single and after a sacrifice, pinch-hitter Rusty Staub was walked intentionally. Ray Knight, who had left the bases full three times already, came through with an RBI double to make it 12–11. The Mets would tack on four more runs in the 19th to go up 16–11.

The Mets then called in Ron Darling, the seventh Mets pitcher, to close it out. Darling would allow two unearned runs before finally recording the final out, coincidentally by striking out Rick Camp.

Once the game was over, even though the date/time was July 5, 3:55 a.m., the Braves' stadium crew shot off the scheduled Fourth of July post-game fireworks for the fans who endured to the end. This was the second latest any major league game has ever ended.

In total, there were 46 hits, 22 walks, 37 runners left on base, five errors, and two ejections. The time of the game was 6 hours, 10 minutes, not counting the rain delays, which tacked on more than two hours.

Linescore

See also
Braves–Mets rivalry

References

External links
 New York Mets at Atlanta Braves Box Score, July 4, 1985 on Baseball Almanac
 New York Mets vs Atlanta Braves July 4, 1985 Box Score on Baseball-Reference.com

New York Mets
Atlanta Braves
1985 Major League Baseball season
July 1985 sports events in the United States
Major League Baseball games
Independence Day (United States)
Baseball competitions in Atlanta
1985 in sports in Georgia (U.S. state)
1985 in Atlanta